Qimivvik (Inuktitut syllabics: ᕿᒥᕝᕕᒃ) formerly Emmerson Island is a member of the Arctic Archipelago in the Qikiqtaaluk Region of Nunavut. Located in Tasiujaq near the mouths of Oliver Sound and Tay Sound, it is an irregularly shaped island off the Baffin Island coast. Mumiksaa lies to its south.

References

Islands of Baffin Island
Uninhabited islands of Qikiqtaaluk Region